Franck Riester (born 3 January 1974) is a French politician who has been serving as Minister Delegate for Parliamentary Relations in the Government of Prime Minister Élisabeth Borne since July 2022. He previously served as Minister Delegate for Foreign Trade and Economic Attractiveness in the governments of Prime Ministers Jean Castex and Élisabeth Borne between 2020 and 2022. A former member of The Republicans, he founded and currently leads the centre-right Agir party.

Riester was a member of the National Assembly for the fifth constituency of Seine-et-Marne from 2007 to 2018 and Minister of Culture in the Second Philippe government from 2018 until his appointment as Minister delegate attached to the Minister for Europe and Foreign Affairs.

Early career
After a stint at accounting firm Arthur Andersen, Riester managed his family's Peugeot car dealership.

Political career

Member of the National Assembly
Riester was a member of the National Assembly from 2007 until 2018. During his time in parliament, he served on the Committee on the Committee on Economic Affairs (2007-2009), the Committee on European Affairs (2009-2011) and the Committee on Cultural Affairs and Education (2009-2018). In his first term from 2007 until 2012, he was the UMP parliamentary group's youngest member. He was also the parliament's rapporteur on the 2009 HADOPI law.

In the 2009 European elections, Riester was the national campaign manager for Nicolas Sarkozy’s UMP party. During Sarkozy’s unsuccessful campaign for the 2012 presidential elections, he served as the party’s head of communications, along with Geoffroy Didier, Valérie Debord, Guillaume Peltier and Salima Saa.

In the Republicans’ 2016 presidential primaries, Riester endorsed Bruno Le Maire as the party's candidate for the office of President of France. When the primaries' winner François Fillon became embroiled in a political affair during his campaign, Riester publicly called on him to step down.

From June 2017, Riester co-chaired UDI and Independents group in the National Assembly, alongside Stéphane Demilly. He was subsequently excluded from the Republicans on October 31, 2017, alongside Gérald Darmanin, Sébastien Lecornu and Thierry Solère. In November 2017, he co-founded a new party, Agir.

Riester was a candidate for mayor of Coulommiers in the 2020 French municipal elections which he won in the first round with more than 50 percent of the vote, but entrusted the role of mayor to Laurence Picard.

Minister of Culture 
Riester is appointed Minister of Culture in the government of Prime Minister Édouard Philippe on 16 October 2018. During his time in office, he announced in September 2019 a public broadcasting reform project aimed at creating "France Médias", bringing together France Télévisions, Radio France, France Médias Monde (Radio France Internationale and France 24) and the National Audiovisual Institute (INA). He also merged the Superior Council of the Audiovisual (CSA) and the Supreme Authority for the Distribution and Protection of Intellectual Property on the Internet (HADOPI).

As minister he attempted to prevent the demolition of the Saint-Joseph Chapel of Saint-Paul College in Lille.

Minister Delegate for Foreign Trade and Economic Attractiveness 
On July 6, 2020, after the appointment of Jean Castex as Prime Minister, Riester is appointed Minister Delegate for Foreign Trade and Economic Attractiveness, attached to the Minister for Europe and Foreign Affairs, Jean-Yves Le Drian.

Political positions
In January 2013, Riester was one of the two UMP deputies, along with Benoist Apparu, to publicly declare his support and vote for a bill legalizing same-sex marriage in France which had been proposed by the government of Prime Minister Jean-Marc Ayrault.

When director Roman Polanski won best directing for his film An Officer and a Spy at the annual César Awards in 2020, his cast and production team boycotted the ceremony after Riester said the success of a director accused of sexual violence would send the wrong signal in the era of the Me Too movement.

Personal life
Riester came out as gay in 2011, the first French MP to do so.

In March 2020, during the coronavirus pandemic Riester tested positive for COVID-19.

References

1974 births
Living people
Politicians from Paris
Union for a Popular Movement politicians
The Republicans (France) politicians
Modern and Humanist France
Agir (France) politicians
Deputies of the 13th National Assembly of the French Fifth Republic
Deputies of the 14th National Assembly of the French Fifth Republic
Deputies of the 15th National Assembly of the French Fifth Republic
Mayors of places in Île-de-France
Gay politicians
ESSEC Business School alumni
ISG Business School alumni
French people of German descent
Commandeurs of the Ordre des Arts et des Lettres
LGBT legislators in France
LGBT conservatism
LGBT mayors of places in France
Members of the Borne government